Helmut K. Anheier (born January 4, 1954) is a German-American academic. He is professor of sociology and past president of the Hertie School in Berlin. Until September 2019 he held a chair at the Max Weber Institute of Sociology, Heidelberg University, where he was also the Academic Director of the Center for Social Investment and Innovation. His research interests include civil society, social innovation, organizational theory, governance and policy research, social science methodology, including indicator models 

Anheier studied sociology and economics at the University of Trier in Germany (1976–80) and obtained a MA, MPhil and PhD at Yale (1981, 1982, 1986). At Yale University, he studied under Juan Linz, Paul DiMaggio, Walter Powell, Scott Boorman and Charles Perrow focusing on comparative sociology, social network analysis and organizational sociology. While being a research assistant at Yale's Program on Nonprofit Organizations, he wrote his dissertation on comparative institutional development in West Africa, which involved fieldwork in Nigeria, Senegal and Togo (1983-4), and constitutes one of the first applications of comparative blockmodel analysis. While in Africa, he also conducted research on informal sector economies, business innovation, land entrepreneurship in urban areas in Nigeria and Ghana as part of a project at the University of Cologne (1985).

In 1986, Anheier became assistant professor for comparative sociology and methodology at Rutgers University, and in 1988 joined the United Nations International Narcotics Control Board  as a social affairs officer on a diplomatic track, where he worked on statistical estimates of the world supply and demand of controlled substances. In 1990, returning to Rutgers University, he also became co-director of the Johns Hopkins Comparative Nonprofit Sector Project, one of the largest social science projects of the 1990s, operating in over forty countries to measure the economic and social relevance of nonprofit organizations. In 1998, he moved to the London School of Economics, where Anheier held a Centennial Professorship (2001-2006) and, with Lord Dahrendorf and Anthony Giddens as mentors, founded and directed the Centre for Civil Society to focus on civil society in the context of European integration. He then moved back to the US as Professor of Public Policy and Social Welfare (2001–11) at the University of California (UCLA), where he established another Center for Civil Society, this time with a focus on Southern California, philanthropy and globalization. While on leave from UCLA, he founded the Center for Social Investment and Innovation at Heidelberg in 2006, later joining the Max Weber Institute of Sociology, before taking on the helm of the Hertie School of Governance in 2009.

Initially, Anheier published mainly on comparative sociology, economic sociology, and social network analysis, and in the 1990s, increasingly on nonprofit organizations in an international perspective. In the 2000s, he published mostly on civil society and its comparative measurement as well as on nonprofit management and policy more generally. In the 2010s, he has so far largely focused on three areas: the role of philanthropic foundations in the U.S. and Europe; social innovations; and governance research, especially governance indicator systems.

Overall, he has published over 450 academic publications, with articles in the top journals of sociological and policy research. His book Nonprofit Organizations has been described as the first fully comprehensive textbook in its field, and won a Best Book Award by the American Academy of Management. His work on civil society, too, did receive several awards. Not only these books but also "When Things Go Wrong" (Sage)  and the Global Studies Encyclopedia (with Mark Juergensmayer, Sage) as well as the Global Civil Society Yearbook (with Mary Kaldor; Oxford University Press, Sage) became reference books in graduate programs in North America and Europe. His recent publications include several special journal issues on hybrid organizations and social innovation, US philanthropy (Brookings Press), and the Hertie School Governance Reports (Oxford University Press).

Anheier contributed to the conceptual and methodological foundations of nonprofit and civil society research in several ways, including the social origins theory (with Lester M Salamon), the Law on Nonprofit Complexity, and the term Creative Philanthropy (with Diana Leat). He was one of the founders of ISTR, the International Society for Third-Sector Research, initiated the United Nations Handbook on Nonprofit Institutions as part of the system of national accounts, founded two journals, Voluntas (journal) and the Journal of Civil Society, initiated several book series (amongst others: The Culture and Globalization Series Vol. 1-5 (Sage); the Global Studies Encyclopedia (Sage); the Global Civil Society Yearbook (Oxford)), pulled together a dictionary, the International Dictionary of Nonprofit and Nongovernmental Organizations with Regina List (Taylor & Francis); and co-edited the first international encyclopedia on civil society and nonprofits.

He holds both US and German citizenship, and is married to artist-designer Emilie Birlo-Anheier.

Selected bibliography
 Helmut K. Anheier. Nonprofit Organizations: Theory, Management and Policy. 2nd edition, fully revised and expanded. New York, NY, London: Routledge (2014).
 David Hammack and Helmut K. Anheier: A Versatile American Institution. Washington DC: The Brookings Institution Press (2013).
 Helmut K. Anheier (ed.): Governance Challenges & Innovations. Financial and Fiscal Governance. Oxford University Press (2013).
 Hertie School of Governance: The Governance Report. Oxford: Oxford University Press (Helmut K. Anheier: Principal Investigator and Coordinator) (2013).
 Helmut K. Anheier and Mark Juergensmeyer (eds.): Global Studies Encyclopedia. 5 Volumes. London, Thousand Oaks, CA: Sage (2012).
 Helmut K. Anheier and Diana Leat: Creative Philanthropy. New York, London: Routledge (2006).
 Helmut K. Anheier and Regina List: International Dictionary of Nonprofit and Nongovernmental Organizations. London: Taylor & Francis (2005).

References

Academics of the London School of Economics
Living people
Public administration scholars
University of California, Los Angeles faculty
Academic staff of Heidelberg University
Academic staff of Hertie School
Yale University alumni
1954 births
German emigrants to the United States